Really Me is a Canadian teen situation comedy series that originally aired on Family. It premiered on April 22, 2011 and on the French-language VRAK.TV on August 31, 2011. On June 13, 2011, Family announced that the series was being renewed for a second season, which premiered on October 5, 2012. No season 3 was planned for the series according to the Fresh TV website in 2012. The final episode aired on April 5, 2013 in Canada. It started airing on Netflix in the U.S. on June 15, 2015.

Plot
The series is about a fifteen-year-old girl named Maddy who wins a contest to get her own reality TV show with her best friend Julia. But being a star isn't as easy as Maddy had thought. She has to deal with the cameras and embarrassing moments that will be seen by all her high school peers and friends. Even though there are tons of cameras, mistakes, and drama, Maddy and Julia will always stick together to get through the many obstacles that they face in their everyday life.

Characters

Main characters
 Maddy Cooper (Sydney Imbeau)Maddy used to be an average fifteen-year-old girl, but once she won the contest to have her own TV show with Julia her life took a spin. Like most teenage girls Maddy wants to date a cute guy, have tons of fun with her friends and be on TV. She's very optimistic, but sometimes that can take her the wrong way. But for better or worse, Maddy is who she is.
Julia Wilson (Kiana Madeira)Julia is Maddy's best friend and always supports her no matter what. She has a crush on Maddy's brother, Brody, but he has no idea. Although, she ends up falling for another guy in "claps of thunder".Julia has a fun and out going personality and she is the type of friend you can count on. Also, she has a knack for opening any lock.
Brody Cooper (Wesley Morgan)Maddy's brother, Brody was born for TV and he loves fame and fortune even more than Maddy. He's a popular athlete, and captain of almost every team at school. He slacks a lot at school and doing work, and he's always desperate for attention.
Clarke Cooper (Azer Greco)Clarke is a very smart little eight-year-old. He is said to be smarter than both his father and brother, Brody, combined. Being famous doesn't bother him since he thinks he would already be famous and rich someday. He has a crush on Julia.
Ray Cooper (Neil Crone)Ray was once a professional hockey player, but still acts like a frat boy. He's the widowed father of Maddy and is thought to have too many pucks to the head because of his silly dad behaviour. He has a lot of time on his hands but he's not very smart so he can easily find himself in ridiculous situations.
Charlene (Heather Hanson)Charlene is the television producer for Maddy's show. She is very sarcastic, stressed out and tends to yell a lot on the phone. However, deep down she's truly a sweet person and cares for Maddy and her family. But when the ratings go low, Charlene does whatever it takes to create drama in Maddy's life.
DJ (Mike Lobel)He just came out of film school, but he is not that smart. He's very eager to please but sometimes forgets to do his job and film the show. He often falls for Maddy's tricks to ditch him and can end up chasing another blond-haired teenager while Maddy escapes. For some reason, he always talks like a slacker (also known as dude slang).

Voiceover
The German dubbing was recorded at TV+Synchron Berlin, dubbing script by Peter Krone, dubbing director Irene Timm. voice of Maddy: Lisa Mitsching, voice of Julia: Julia Meynen, voice of Brody: Konrad Bösherz, voice of Clarke: Moritz Russ, voice of Ray: Bernd Vollbrecht, voice of Charlene: Ktharina Tomaschewsky, voice of DJ: Asad Schwarz.

Episodes

Season 1 (2011–12)

Season 2 (2012–13)

Shorts (2011)

Telecast and home release
Really Me originally aired on Family. It premiered on April 22, 2011 and on the French-language VRAK.TV on August 31, 2011. The final episode aired on April 5, 2013 in Canada with repeats aired until the mid-2010s. It started airing on Netflix in the U.S. on June 15, 2015.
Foreign networks had been aired with the show: HBO Family in Latin America and Brazil, Pop Girl in the United Kingdom, RTÉ Two (part of TRTÉ) in Ireland, JOJO in Turkey, Frisbee in Italy, KiKa in Germany, ABC3 in Australia, Star TV in Romania, and Disney Channel in the Netherlands and Belgium.
In the early 2010s, Australian distributor is eventually planning a three-disc DVD set (seasons 1 and 2) with all episodes from the show.

References

External links 
 
 

2010s Canadian high school television series
2010s Canadian teen sitcoms
2011 Canadian television series debuts
2013 Canadian television series endings
Family Channel (Canadian TV network) original programming
Television series by FremantleMedia Kids & Family
Television series about teenagers
Television shows filmed in Toronto
Television shows set in Toronto
Television series by Fremantle (company)